Tartar Uprising – the first uprising against the Soviet occupation in 1920. Rashid agha Javanshir was one of the leaders of the uprising. 
Rashid agha was the descendant of the Panah Ali Khan who was the founder of Karabagh Khanate.

About

Outbreak of the uprising 
On May 21, 1920 residents of the Tartar District staged an armed uprising. By killing 80 Red Army soldiers, they declared their disobedience to the new Soviet government. The commander of the Red Army was killed by insurgents.

Suppression of the uprising 

After 3 days, Dadash Bunyadzade and Chingiz Ildyrym were delegated to the region to suppress the uprising.  At the same time, to prevent this uprising, Soviet government sent armed forces to Tartar District. 
The Tartar uprising was brutally suppressed in May. Some villages were set on fire by shelling. 
After short time of suppression of the Tartar uprising, the new uprising broke out in Karabakh and the people of Tartar joined the new uprising,

See also 
 Guba Uprising (1920)
 1920 Ganja revolt
 Lankaran Uprisings

References 

Anti-Bolshevik uprisings
Azerbaijan Soviet Socialist Republic
Tartar District
1920 in Azerbaijan
Conflicts in 1920
Mass murder in 1920
Azerbaijani resistance movement